The A1156 road runs through the centre of Ipswich, Suffolk, England. Formerly part of the A45, the road connects the A14, to the north-west of Ipswich to the A14 (again), and the A12 to the south-east of Ipswich, at the Seven Hills junction.

References

Transport in Ipswich
Roads in Suffolk